Duke, in the United Kingdom, is the highest-ranking hereditary title in all five peerages of the British Isles. A duke thus outranks all other holders of titles of nobility (marquess, earl, viscount and baron or lord of parliament).

The wife of a duke is known as a duchess, which is also the title of a woman who holds a dukedom in her own right, referred to as a duchess suo jure; her husband, however, does not receive any title.  In the order of precedence in the United Kingdom, non-royal dukes without state offices or positions generally take precedence before all other nobility, in order of date of creation, but after royalty and certain officers of state.

Royal dukedoms

A royal duke is a duke who is a member of the British royal family, entitled to the style of "His Royal Highness". The current royal dukedoms are, in order of precedence of their holders (that is, not in order of precedence of the dukedoms themselves): 
Duke of Cornwall (England), Duke of Rothesay (Scotland), and Duke of Cambridge, held by Prince William
Duke of Sussex, held by Prince Harry
Duke of York, held by Prince Andrew
Duke of Edinburgh, held by Prince Edward
Duke of Gloucester, held by Prince Richard
Duke of Kent, held by Prince Edward (who should not be confused with the Duke of Edinburgh)

The title Duke of Edinburgh (United Kingdom) was held by Charles III from 9 April 2021 until 8 September 2022, when it merged into the crown upon his accession to the throne. He then granted it to his brother, Prince Edward, on Edward's 59th birthday in 2023.

With the exceptions of the dukedoms of Cornwall and Rothesay (which can only be held by the eldest son of the Sovereign) as well as the dukedom of Edinburgh (which is a life peerage that will become extinct on the death of the current Duke), royal dukedoms are hereditary, according to the terms of the letters patent that created them, which usually contain the standard remainder to the "heirs male of his body". The British monarch also holds and is entitled to the revenues of the Duchy of Lancaster, and within the borders of the County Palatine of Lancashire is by tradition saluted as "The Duke of Lancaster" even though the title is technically extinct. While in the Channel Islands, the monarch is The Duke of Normandy. Even when the monarch is a Queen regnant, she does not use the title of Duchess.

Non-royal dukedoms
These are extant non-royal dukes in the United Kingdom.
Duke of Abercorn (Ireland)
Duke of Argyll (Scotland), (United Kingdom)
Duke of Atholl (Scotland)
Duke of Beaufort (England)
Duke of Bedford (England)
Duke of Buccleuch (Scotland), Duke of Queensberry (Scotland) (currently all one person)
Duke of Devonshire (England)
Duke of Fife (United Kingdom)
Duke of Grafton (England)
Duke of Hamilton (Scotland), Duke of Brandon (Great Britain) (currently all one person)
Duke of Leinster (Ireland)
Duke of Manchester (Great Britain)
Duke of Marlborough (England)
Duke of Montrose (Scotland)
Duke of Norfolk (England)
Duke of Northumberland (Great Britain)
Duke of Richmond (England), Duke of Gordon (United Kingdom), Duke of Lennox (Scotland) (currently all one person)
Duke of Roxburghe (Scotland)
Duke of Rutland (England)
Duke of Somerset (England)
Duke of St Albans (England)
Duke of Sutherland (United Kingdom)
Duke of Wellington (United Kingdom)
Duke of Westminster (United Kingdom)

Forms of address

Begin: My Lord Duke
Address: His Grace the Duke of _
Speak to as: Your Grace (formal and employees), Duke (social)
Ceremonial, formal, or legal title: The Most High, Noble and Potent Prince His Grace [forename], Duke of _.

Coronet
A British or Irish duke is entitled to a coronet (a silver-gilt circlet, chased as jewelled but not actually gemmed) bearing eight conventional strawberry leaves on the rim of the circlet. The physical coronet is worn only at coronations. Any peer can bear his coronet of rank on his coat of arms above the shield.

See also
British nobility
List of dukes in the peerages of Britain and Ireland
List of dukedoms in the peerages of Britain and Ireland

References

 
Peerages in the United Kingdom